Kapri Simmons, more commonly known as Marcus Simmons, (born July 16, 2000) is a Canadian professional soccer player who plays for Vancouver FC in the Canadian Premier League.

Early career
Simmons played youth soccer with Edmonton Green & Gold, and was later a part of the FC Edmonton academy. He won a silver medal with Team Alberta at the 2017 Canada Summer Games.

In the offseason of 2021, Simmons played with amateur club Edmonton Scottish and participated in the 2021 Summer Series and AMSL, notably scoring a 1st minute goal against Calgary Foothills in the home opener.

University career
In 2018, he began attending MacEwan University, playing for the men's soccer team. He made his debut for MacEwan on September 8, 2018, earning an assist on the game-winning goal against the Mount Royal Cougars. He scored his first goal exactly a year later on September 8, 2019, also against the Mount Royal Cougars. He played two seasons with the Griffins, scoring once and adding three assists in 23 appearances.

Following a summer stint with Edmonton Scottish, he transferred to York University and began playing for the York Lions in 2021. He appeared in nine season games, scoring once, along with appearing in the all three of the team's playoff matches for the Lions, helping them to an OUA silver medal.

Club career
After impressing in his pre-season trial, Simmons signed a professional contract with FC Edmonton of the Canadian Premier League in 2022.

In January 2023, Simmons joined Vancouver FC in the Canadian Premier League.

References

External links

2000 births
Living people
Association football forwards
Canadian soccer players
FC Edmonton players
Canadian Premier League players
York Lions soccer players
Soccer players from Edmonton
Vancouver FC players